9,10-Dihydroanthracene is an organic compound that is derived from the polycyclic aromatic hydrocarbon anthracene.  Several isomers of dihydroanthracene are known, but the 9,10 derivative is most common.  It is a colourless solid that is used as a carrier of H2 as a hydrogen-donor.

Preparation
Because the aromaticity is not compromised for the flanking rings, anthracene is susceptible to hydrogenation at the 9- and 10- positions.  It is produced in the laboratory by dissolving metal reduction using sodium/ethanol, an application of the Bouveault–Blanc reduction developed by Louis Bouveault and Gustave Louis Blanc in 1903. The reduction can be effected by magnesium as well.  Finally, it can also be prepared by the coupling of benzyl chloride using aluminium chloride as a catalyst.

The bond dissociation energy for the 9- and 10- carbon–hydrogen bonds are estimated at 78 kcal mol−1.  Thus these bonds are about 20% weaker than typical C–H bonds.

References

Anthracenes